Rami Makhlouf (born 10 July 1969) is a Syrian businessman and the maternal cousin of president Bashar al-Assad. At the beginning of the Syrian Civil War in 2011, he was considered to be Syria's richest and one of the most powerful man. According to Syrian analysts, he is part of al-Assad's inner circle and no foreign company could do business in Syria at the time without his consent and partnership.

In 2016, he was reported to own Syriatel, the largest mobile phone network in Syria, along with other retail, banking and real estate companies. Makhlouf had a falling out with al-Assad in the spring of 2020 and was placed under house arrest, resulting in the arrest of many of his aides, along with the targeting of his companies by security forces. He was stripped of his shares in Syriatel, and the consortium he had established as the biggest investment vehicle in Syria was also taken off line. Makhlouf's remaining assets in Syria are considered to be insignificant compared to the billions he has transferred abroad on behalf of Bashar al-Assad.

Early life and education
Rami Makhlouf was born on 10 July 1969, and graduated with a degree in Civil Engineering from Damascus University in 1993. He is related to the Assad family through his aunt, Anisa Makhlouf, who was the wife of the late Syrian president Hafez al-Assad. Makhlouf's personal wealth accumulated abroad was estimated to be in excess of $10 billion in 2020.

Business activities
Makhlouf is the main owner of Syriatel, one of two licensed mobile phone companies in Syria. Besides Syriatel, he is involved in real estate, banking, free trade zones along the border with Lebanon, duty-free shops, and luxury department stores. According to the Financial Times, he is thought to control as much as 60% of the Syrian economy through his web of business interests.

Makhlouf was among a diverse group of connected insiders who monopolized the small, but growing, Syrian private sector in the 1990s. As President Hafez al-Assad prepared for his son's succession, the distribution of assets from privatization began to shift clearly in favor of the Makhloufs. Assad believed the Makhlouf family could be relied upon to support Bashar without reserve in the uncertain political environment that would follow upon his death, unlike other insiders, who had close financial ties to billionaire Lebanese Prime Minister Rafiq Hariri, such as former Syrian Vice President Abdul Halim Khaddam. Rami and his brother Ihab therefore enjoyed easy access to opportunities such as an exclusive license to operate a network of duty-free retail shops, where a significant portion of goods were redistributed inside the country. By the time Bashar assumed power in 2000, Rami Makhlouf was well established.

Makhlouf is thought to have tried in 2004 to take over the Mercedes concession in Syria, by ensuring passage of a law denying Mercedes the right to import parts unless Makhlouf was made the exclusive agent for Mercedes in Syria. Mercedes wanted to keep the Sankar family, who had had the concession since the 1960s. Mercedes ceased all activity in Syria until the dispute was resolved, and the Mercedes concession is now once again controlled by the Sankar family.

Makhlouf's current business interests are extensive, which include business interests in Syria’s oil and gas industries, banking, construction and duty-free shops. He is the majority owner of Cham Holding which has investments in luxury tourism, restaurants, and real estate through Bena Properties. Cham Holding also controls Syrian Pearl Airlines, the first private airline to be allowed in the country. He is also invested in several private banks established in Syria, such as the International Islamic Bank of Syria, Al Baraka Bank, International Bank of Qatar, Cham Bank, and the Bank of Jordan in Syria; in insurance and financial services companies, such as Cham Capital. Like his father, Mohammed Makhlouf, he is active in the oil sector, via the British oil company Gulfsands Petroleum. He is also invested in real estate companies such as Sourouh, Fajr, Al Batra, and Al Hada'iq; in tourism companies such as Al Mada'in and in media companies such as the daily Al Watan, radio/television station Ninar and satellite station Dunya TV, advertising companies like Promedia; in education companies such as the Chouwayfat schools; in industry through the Eltel Middle East company; and in public works companies such as Ramak TP. Rami Makhlouf has extensive land holdings in the United States Virgin Islands, which were the subject of court litigation. Because of this litigation he transferred his U.S. holdings to his brother Ihab. The Makhloufs also have a monopoly on the import of tobacco into Syria. In 2008, the U.S. Treasury Department froze the U.S. assets and restricted the financial transactions of Rami Makhlouf.

Makhlouf maintains a close relationship with Bushra al-Assad, Bashar's older sister, and her husband Assef Shawkat. He also operates a number of business projects in Lebanon with Maher al-Assad, Bashar's younger brother. There are reports of tensions between the two, which is thought to explain why parts of the Makhlouf business were shifted in 2005 to Dubai. Some observers believe the transfers were made because the Makhloufs were worried that they were going to be made the scapegoats of an anti-corruption propaganda campaign.

On 5 July 2012, it was reported that the Central Bank of the UAE ordered the banks and financial institutions to search for and submit details of any financial assets and transactions performed by the Syrian ruling elite, including Rami Makhlouf. This search was based on the decision of the Ministerial Council of the League of Arab States dated 27 November 2011, to impose multiple sanctions on Syria, and on and decisions issued by the European Union and the United States involving economic sanctions on Syria.

Controversies

Accusations of corruption 
In February 2008, the United States Department of the Treasury designated Makhlouf as a beneficiary and facilitator of public corruption in Syria. His influence and connections within the government have allowed him to control the issuance of certain types of profitable commodities contracts, it said. According to the US Treasury, "Makhlouf has manipulated the Syrian judicial system and used Syrian intelligence officials to intimidate his business rivals. He employed these techniques when trying to acquire exclusive licenses to represent foreign companies in Syria and to obtain contract awards." On 10 May 2011, the European Union placed sanctions on him for "bankrolling the government and allowing violence against demonstrators". Makhlouf's brother Hafez Makhlouf was until 2014 head of Syria's intelligence agency, the General Security Directorate.

Political observers generally accept that Makhlouf's great wealth is a result of his close family ties to the Syrian government. It is reported that Bashar al-Assad before he became president would during official meetings try to make business contacts for Rami. In US diplomatic cables leaked by WikiLeaks, Rami Makhlouf is described as a powerful government financer. Makhlouf has further been accused of illegally diverting Lebanese telephone calls through Syria with the help of businessman Pierre Fattouch for the benefit of Syriatel.

Makhlouf controlled three Syrian companies close to the government of Bashar Al-Assad – Maxima Middle East Trading, Morgan Additives Manufacturing and Pangates International. These companies used Mossack Fonseca shell companies registered in the Seychelles and British Virgin Islands to ease the pressure global sanctions put on his cousin's regime. He paid for the Syrian Air Force helicopter fuel through shell companies, for example. The US Treasury sanctioned Makhlouf, charging that Pangates had supplied the Assad government with a thousand tonnes of aviation fuel.

Makhlouf was able to continue unimpeded operations through the shell companies, since neither jurisdiction fell under US law; however the EU sanctions did affect the companies in the British Virgin Islands. HSBC told the law firm that the Swiss authorities had frozen Makhlouf's accounts, and that "they have had no contact with the beneficial owner of this company since the last 3 months". The Swiss Federal Administrative Court in 2015 rejected an appeal of the block on his use of an undisclosed sum in his Swiss accounts.

Makhlouf was seen by the rebels as a symbol of corruption in Syria. In Daraa during the Syrian Civil War, demonstrators called him a "thief". Syrian dissident Riad Seif was arrested and imprisoned for several years because of his criticism of Rami Makhlouf. Seif, a member of parliament and one of the most ardent critics of the Syrian government, became known outside of Syria because of his criticism of the government during the Damascus Spring of 2001. Despite several warnings from the Syrian government not to interfere, Seif began an anticorruption campaign in September 2001 against the way the two GSM mobile phone licenses were awarded, of which one to Maklouf's Syriatel. Shortly thereafter Seif lost his parliamentary immunity and was arrested and imprisoned for five years. United Nations observers at its Commission of Inquiry on the Syrian Arab Republic, set up in 2011, have documented "mass arrests by regime forces, leading to the enforced disappearance of large groups of fighting-age men."

Makhlouf was implicated in the leaked 2016 Panama Papers, which detailed his control over Syria's national industries. His name also surfaced as part of the Swissleaks investigation. Frederik Obermaier, an investigative reporter at the German newspaper Süddeutsche Zeitung, told Democracy Now!: "[Mossack Fonseca] realised that [Makhlouf] was the cousin, and they realised that he was sanctioned, and they realised that he's allegedly one of the financiers of the Syrian regime. And they said, 'Oh, there is this bank who still does business with him, so we should still keep with him, as well'."

Syrian Civil War 

Some opposition activists during the Syrian Civil War accused Makhlouf of financing pro-government demonstrations both across Syria and abroad, by providing flags, meals and money for those participating. The tycoon insisted his businesses are legitimate and provide professional employment for thousands of Syrians. Opposition activists claim that Makhlouf finances the Syrian Electronic Army, and masterminded its move out of Syria to one of his Dubai companies.

On 9 May 2011, Makhlouf said that "if there is no stability here, there’s no way there will be stability in Israel", then he added, "no way, and nobody can guarantee what will happen after, God forbid, anything happens to this regime", in an interview with The New York Times.

On 16 June 2011, Makhlouf stated that he would "quit the Syrian business scene". Syria Files examined by Al Akhbar showed that Makhlouf continued to invest in several banks during 2011 and 2012. In late January 2012, he bought about 15 times as many shares (by value) as he sold, buying  and selling  of shares, mostly in Qatar National Bank–Syria and Syria International Islamic Bank.

In Summer 2019, Makhlouf's charitable network, the al-Bustan Association, was forced to shut down. It had previously supported the families of fallen soldiers and funded a militia of about 20,000 men. In December 2019, Syrian customs issued an order to freeze Beirut-registered Abar Petroleum Service SAL assets, including assets of Makhlouf, for violating import regulations by smuggling  worth of goods. Moreover, Makhlouf was also accused of smuggling oil into Syria, in breach of international sanctions. On 22 April 2020, Egyptian authorities seized 4 tonnes of hashish hidden in a cargo of milk cartons, related to a company owned by Makhlouf, in Port Said which was heading to Libya; however, he later claimed that the incident was a set-up aimed at “defaming” him.

Prosecution proceedings 
On 1 May 2020, Makhlouf made an "unprecedented" public appeal to his cousin President Bashar al-Assad on Facebook, saying a "cadre of officials" were seeking to seize his assets, as he was pressured to hand over in excess of  due to tax evasion. Makhlouf, who was a part of President al-Assad's inner circle said he would pay the President himself but not the state. Two days later, he posted another video on Facebook, where he mentioned that Syrian security forces arrested some of his employees. However, speculations indicate that the Syrian first lady, Asma al-Assad, has been responsible for the whole plot, the reason was that "many businessmen loyal to Asma Assad competed with Makhlouf for control of diminishing resources, after the collapse of the Syrian pound, along with sanctions, made the space in which they compete narrow and difficult", according to Dr. Muhannad Al-Hajj Ali, a researcher at the Carnegie Middle East Center. In addition, the Syrian authorities might have targeted Makhlouf in order to find resources prior to the implementation of U.S. sanctions related to the Caesar Act.

On 17 May, Makhlouf posted another video on Facebook, where he mentioned rising pressure on him to hand over profits or might be arrested. On 19 May, the Syrian government seized all assets belonging to Makhlouf. On 21 May, a Syrian court placed a temporary travel ban on Makhlouf. On 25 June, the Syrian government terminated duty free contracts in all ports and border crossings with companies affiliated with Makhlouf.

Children lifestyle 
Rami Makhlouf's children have garnered controversy for their luxurious lifestyle Ali Makhlouf is an Instagram celebrity with over 250,000 followers. caused controversy when he was spotted in Beverly Hills, California driving a Ferrari Spider. In the United States, Republican Congressman Joe Wilson, a member of the House Armed Services Committee, told the Washington Free Beacon that ""image of Ali Makhlouf, cousin of brutal Syrian dictator Bashar al-Assad, driving a $300,000 Ferrari on the streets of LA, is disgusting," questioning how Ali Makhlouf obtained a visa to the United States while his father Rami was sanctioned.  Rami Makhlouf's other son, Mohammed Makhlouf, was briefly detained in Syria after outrage over his luxury influencer lifestyle.

Personal life
Makhlouf is married to Razan Othman. They have two sons, Mohammad and Ali Makhlouf.

Other citizenships 
Rami Makhlouf applied but failed to obtain Austrian citizenship from 2009 to 2011. In the meantime, he held Cypriot citizenship from 2010 to 2011, which was revoked when the civil war broke out in Syria.

See also

Al-Assad family
Syrian civil war

References

External links
Syrian Businessman Becomes Magnet for Anger and Dissent, Anthony Shadid, The New York Times, 30 April 2011

1969 births
Assad family
Living people
People of the Syrian civil war
21st-century Syrian businesspeople
People named in the Panama Papers
Syrian billionaires
People named in the Paradise Papers
Sanctioned due to Syrian civil war
Syrian individuals subject to U.S. Department of the Treasury sanctions
Syrian individuals subject to the European Union sanctions
Syrian oligarchs